Comal may refer to:

 COMAL, a computer programming language
 Comal (cookware), a type of griddle

Places
 Comal River (Indonesia)
 Comal County, Texas, U.S.
 Comal River, Texas, U.S.
 Comal Springs (Texas), U.S.

See also